4-oxalomesaconate tautomerase (GalD) is an enzyme with systematic name 4-oxalomesaconate keto---enol-isomerase. This enzyme catalyses the following chemical reaction

 (1E)-4-oxobut-1-ene-1,2,4-tricarboxylate  (1E,3E)-4-hydroxybuta-1,3-diene-1,2,4-tricarboxylate

This enzyme has been characterized from the bacterium Pseudomonas putida.

References

External links 
 

EC 5.3.2